Folgore is the Italian word for lightning. It may refer to:

Military
Macchi C.202 Folgore, an Italian fighter of World War II
Breda Folgore, an Italian anti-armor weapon
Traditional name for parachute units of the Italian Army
185th Parachute Division Folgore, a World War II Italian Army unit
Folgore Brigade, the modern Italian Army unit
Folgore-class destroyer, a group of destroyers built for the Italian Navy in the 1930s
Italian cruiser Folgore, a torpedo cruiser built in the 1880s

Other uses
Folgore da San Gimignano (1270–1332), Italian poet
Parco Folgore, a character in the anime and manga series Zatch Bell!
S.S. Folgore Falciano Calcio, or simply Falgore, a Sammarinese association football club